Gianluca Festa (born 15 March 1969) is an Italian professional football manager and former player. Festa played as a defender for clubs such as Internazionale and Roma, and is best known playing for Middlesbrough and Cagliari.

Playing career

Cagliari, Inter and Roma 
Born in Cagliari, Festa started his career at his hometown club Cagliari Calcio. During the 1987–88 season, he was loaned to Fersulcis. After his loan spell he started impressing and showing constant performances at Cagliari which eventually made Inter Milan show interest, whom he joined in 1993. In his first year at the club he only made 4 league starts for Inter, and was transferred to Serie A rivals A.S. Roma. His form for Roma then earned him a move back to Inter Milan where he became a regular starter for the club, however prior to joining Middlesbrough he lost his place in the team and found himself mainly as a substitute.

Middlesbrough 
In 1997, Festa joined Middlesbrough, being one of the first Italians to play in the Premier League. Festa arrived at Middlesbrough from Inter Milan in the midst of a relegation battle to add steel to the defence. Festa was the second Italian at the club with Middlesbrough also having Italian International Fabrizio Ravanelli at the club. Festa scored on an impressive winning debut against Sheffield Wednesday in January 1997. Festa had been an accomplished martial arts master, a junior Italian tennis champion and captain of the Army team when he did his national service. He had shrewd positional sense, was tough in the tackle, a dominating figure in the air and got forward on occasions to score the odd important goal. After scoring in the semi final against Chesterfield, a goal that could have been even more historic was ruled out when Festa's header in the 1997 FA Cup Final was deemed offside. That was one of three Wembley appearances he made in his first 18 months at the club.

When many of Middlesbrough's players left following relegation, Festa stayed and helped win promotion back to the top flight. His performances earned him the Middlesbrough player of the year award in 1998. Festa was squeezed out by the arrivals of England internationals Gareth Southgate and Ugo Ehiogu but remained as a squad player. In his final season at Boro they again reached the FA Cup semi finals. This time they faced Arsenal. Festa came on as a substitute for the injured Ehiogu with the score poised at 0–0. However, he unfortunately scored an own goal which proved to be decisive, as Arsenal reached the final with a narrow 1–0 win. Other memorable moments for Festa include scoring a late equaliser in a 3–3 draw with Southampton despite his team being reduced to 9 men, and an equaliser against North East rivals Newcastle United.

Portsmouth 
In 2002, Festa left Middlesbrough for a short spell at Portsmouth, where he scored once against Bradford City and was part of the squad that won the First Division and gained promotion to the Premier League. He left Portsmouth at the end of the season.

Return to Cagliari and lower league football 
In 2003, he returned to Italy, joining Cagliari and helping the rossoblu win promotion to the Serie A. In 2004, he joined Eccellenza Sardinia side Nuorese Calcio, serving as team captain and leading the club to two consecutive promotions. At the end of the 2006–07 season, and an unsuccessful appearance in the Serie C2 playoffs, he left the team by mutual consent in September 2007. Festa then signed for Tavolara in the Serie D, coached by his former teammate Vittorio Pusceddu. He ended his career after playing for Sanluri in the Eccellenza Sardinia in the 2008–09 season.

Style of play
Usually deployed as a central defender, Festa was known for his strength in the air, ability to organize the back-line, and his eye for scoring goals despite being a defender, having scored at least once in every season of his career since the 1993–94 season.

Honours
Inter Milan
UEFA Cup: 1993–94

Coaching career

Cagliari
On 14 April 2010, he was appointed as assistant manager to newly appointed manager Giorgio Melis at his former club Cagliari. He has also been in charge of the club's Primavera team.

Lumezzane
On 14 June 2012, he was appointed the new manager of Lumezzane in the Lega Pro Prima Divisione. In March 2013, Festa left Lumezzane and was replaced by Lumezzane captain Michele Marcolini.

Leeds United: Massimo Cellino takeover
On 31 January 2014, Festa was tipped to replace Brian McDermott as new manager of Leeds United, a decision which caused uproar amongst the club's fans. On 1 February, it was rumoured that Festa was to sit in the dugout for Leeds United's game against Ipswich Town. With McDermott being reinstated as manager on 1 February, during the second half of the Huddersfield Town match, on 3 February McDermott revealed in his press conference that Gianluca Festa had changed the starting lineup on 31 January for the fixture against Huddersfield Town, only for the team to then be changed back again to the original starting lineup on 1 February by McDermott's assistant manager Nigel Gibbs, who also took charge as caretaker instead of Festa. McDermott also revealed that on 3 February that Festa was still present in training, however this time acting as a translator for new signing Andrea Tabanelli. Tabanelli was signed in between the window of McDermott's "sacking" and his reinstatement.

Return to Cagliari
On 22 April 2015, following Zdeněk Zeman's resignation, Festa was appointed as the new manager of relegation-threatened Serie A side Cagliari, returning to the club he both played for and served as assistant manager. Despite winning a number of matches Festa was unable to prevent Cagliari from being relegated to the Serie B. At the end of the season, Festa left the club and was replaced by Massimo Rastelli.

Como
On 1 November 2015, he was named new manager of Como in the Serie B. He was sacked on 13 March 2016 with the club being at the bottom of the table.

AEL
On 24 September 2018, he was named new manager of AEL in the Super League Greece. During his time in Larissa, he managed to keep the team in the Super League and thus avoided relegation. At the end of the season he resigned.

On 21 January 2021, he returned to AEL for a second spell. He was sacked on 9 May 2021, following a 3–1 away defeat against Volos.

Apollon Smyrnis 
On 24 September 2021, he was announced as the new manager of Apollon Smyrnis in the Super League Greece.

Managerial statistics 
As of 13 November 2022

Honours
Cagliari Calcio
Serie C: 1988–89

References

External links
 Profile of Gianluca Festa (from Nuorese official website)
 Profile at tuttocalciatori.net
 Profile at archiviorossoblu.it

1969 births
Living people
Sportspeople from Cagliari
Italian footballers
Italian expatriate footballers
Serie A players
Serie B players
Serie C players
Premier League players
A.S. Roma players
Cagliari Calcio players
Inter Milan players
Middlesbrough F.C. players
Portsmouth F.C. players
Nuorese Calcio players
UEFA Cup winning players
Expatriate footballers in England
Italian football managers
Cagliari Calcio managers
Serie A managers
Footballers from Sardinia
Association football defenders
FA Cup Final players